Cyperus alaticaulis is a species of sedge that is native to Queensland in Australia.

See also 
 List of Cyperus species

References 

alaticaulis
Flora of Queensland
Plants described in 2009